Strawberries Need Rain is a 1970 film directed by Larry Buchanan and starring Les Tremayne and Monica Gayle.

The film was inspired by the works of Ingmar Bergman and Buchanan allegedly talked some theatre owners into advertising it as a Bergman film. It was shot in various German towns in the Texas Hill Country.

Buchanan described the "story as essentially European in nature".

References

External links

1970 films
1970 drama films
American International Pictures films
Films directed by Larry Buchanan
1970s English-language films